Helen Doron (née Helen Rachel Lowenthal, 5 November 1955) is a British-Israeli linguist and educator based in Israel. She is best known as the creator of the Helen Doron Method of teaching and as the Founder of Helen Doron Educational Group, an international pedagogic network for babies, children, and teens learning English and other programs, including Helen Doron Academy Kindergartens, Helen Doron International, MathRiders and Helen Doron Connect.

Biography
Doron was born and raised in the Hampstead region of north-west London. Her mother was a primary school teacher. From 1973-1977, Doron studied Linguistics Science and French at the University of Reading, earning a dual B.A. degree with honors. She then taught English language and literature at the University of Poitiers in France for a year. Following that, she moved to Israel where she met her husband and settled there. Doron currently lives in Israel and has 3 children (Ella, Benaya and Adam) and 5 grandchildren.

Methodology
In developing her method of teaching, Doron was influenced by the methodology of Dr. Shinichi Suzuki, the founder of
the Suzuki method and the Doman method developed by Glenn Doman. After a few years she developed her own methodology, known as the Helen Doron English method (HDE) for children ages 3 months -19 years old. 
 
The methodology is built on two basic cornerstones of mother-tongue language learning, which include Repeated Background Home Hearing and Positive Reinforcement. The method has an integrated series of courses that are designed to complement each other as the students grow and advance in studies. 
 
Thus, the HDE method represents a combination of early language acquisition based on Suzuki’s and Doman’s methodologies for early learning and mother-tongue approach with the critical revision of the traditional methods that lack individual approach, insufficient feedback, individual speaking time and more. 
 
In a study published in Procedia - Social and Behavioral Sciences, the authors found that the Helen Doron Early English courses were "one of the most famous and successful courses in teaching English as a second language to pre-school children in the Czech Republic." The Helen Doron learning process was also studied in Poland, with very young English learners.

Educational Group
Helen Doron began teaching in 1985, using cassette tapes she made herself with songs, poems and stories in English. In 1987, the first learning centre was opened and the first franchise opened in Austria in 1997. By early 2000s, approximately 15,000 children in Israel took part in Helen Doron classes from the franchise. As of 2002, there were more than 8,000 children involved in Germany, Poland, South Korea and several other countries. Other locations include Spain, Peru, Ecuador and Mexico.
 
Helen Doron learning centres are part of a franchise network with the main company's headquarters located in Misgav, Israel.

As of 2022, HDEG is active in 40 countries with more than 1200 learning centers and kindergartens.
 
The Helen Doron Educational Group also has numerous apps through a designated website and digital distribution platforms such as Google Play and Apple Store and the TeenBuzz interactive radio station with participants throughout the world .

References

External links
 Official Helen Doron English Website
 Official Helen Doron Educational Group Website
 

 

English educators
Linguists from the United Kingdom
Women linguists
People from London
Living people
Academic staff of the University of Poitiers
English emigrants to Israel
1955 births